The University of Oxford has thirty-nine colleges, and five permanent private halls (PPHs) of religious foundation. Colleges (with the exception of three 'societies of the university') and PPHs are autonomous self-governing corporations within the university. These colleges are not only houses of residence, but have substantial responsibility for teaching undergraduate students. Generally tutorials (one of the main methods of teaching in Oxford) and classes are the responsibility of colleges, while lectures, examinations, laboratories, and the central library are run by the university. Students normally have most of their tutorials in their own college, but often have a couple of modules taught at other colleges or even at faculties and departments. Most colleges take both graduates and undergraduates, but several are for graduates only.

Undergraduate and graduate students may name preferred colleges in their applications. For undergraduate students, an increasing number of departments practise reallocation to ensure that the ratios between potential students and subject places available at each college are as uniform as possible. For the Department of Physics, reallocation is done on a random basis after a shortlist of candidates is drawn upon and before candidates are invited for interviews at the university.

For graduate students, many colleges express a preference for candidates who plan to undertake research in an area of interest of one of its fellows. St Hugh's College, for example, states that it accepts graduate students in most subjects, principally those in the fields of interest of the fellows of the college.

A typical college consists of a hall for dining, a chapel, a library, a college bar, senior, middle (postgraduate), and junior common rooms, rooms for 200–400 undergraduates as well as lodgings for the head of the college and other dons. College buildings range from medieval to modern, but most are made up of interlinked quadrangles (courtyards), with a porter's lodge controlling entry from the outside.

2008 saw the first modern merger of colleges, with Green College and Templeton College merging to form Green Templeton College. This reduced the number of colleges of the university from 39 to 38. The number of PPHs also reduced when Greyfriars closed in 2008 and when St Benet's Hall closed in 2022. However, with the establishment of Reuben College in 2019, the number of colleges of the university again increased to 39. Reuben is the first new Oxbridge college since 1990, when Kellogg College was established.

History

The collegiate system arose because Oxford University came into existence through the gradual agglomeration of numerous independent institutions. Over the centuries several different types of college have emerged and disappeared.

Monastic halls
The first academic houses were monastic halls. Of the dozens established during the 12th–15th centuries, none survived the Reformation. The modern Dominican permanent private hall of Blackfriars (1921) is a descendant of the original (1221), and is sometimes described as heir to the oldest tradition of teaching in Oxford.

Academic halls

As the university took shape, friction between the hundreds of students living where and how they pleased led to a decree that all undergraduates would have to reside in approved halls. What eventually put an end to the medieval halls was the emergence of colleges. Often generously endowed and with permanent teaching staff, the colleges were originally the preserve of graduate students. However, once they began accepting fee-paying undergraduates in the 14th century, the halls' days were numbered. Of the hundreds of Aularian houses (from the Latin for "hall") that sprang up, only St Edmund Hall (c. 1225) remains.

Colleges
The oldest colleges are University College, Balliol, and Merton, established between 1249 and 1264, although there is some dispute over the exact order and precisely when each began teaching. The fourth oldest college is Exeter, founded in 1314, and the fifth is Oriel, founded in 1326.

Women's colleges

Women entered the university in 1879, with the opening of Lady Margaret Hall and Somerville College, becoming members of the University (and thus eligible to receive degrees) in 1920. Other women's colleges before integration were St Anne's, St Hilda's and St Hugh's. In 1974 the first men's colleges to admit women were Brasenose, Hertford, Jesus, St Catherine's and Wadham. By 2008 all colleges had become co-residential, although one of the Permanent Private Halls, St Benet's Hall, did not start to admit postgraduate women until Michaelmas term 2014 and women undergraduates until Michaelmas 2016.

Postgraduate and mature colleges
Some colleges, such as Kellogg, Linacre, Nuffield, St Antony's, St Cross and Wolfson only admit postgraduate students. All Souls admits only fellows. Harris Manchester is intended for "mature students" with a minimum age of 21. A new graduate college of the University, Reuben College, was established in 2019 and plans to enrol its first students in 2021, using the premises of the Radcliffe Science Library.

Societies
Kellogg, Reuben and St Cross are the only Oxford colleges without a royal charter. They are officially societies of the university rather than independent colleges and are considered departments of the university for accounting purposes.

Private halls

The Oxford University Act 1854 and the university statute De aulis privatis (On private Halls) of 1855, allowed any Master of Arts aged at least 28 years to open a private hall after obtaining a licence to do so. One such was Charsley's Hall.

Permanent private halls
The Universities Tests Act 1871 opened all university degrees and positions to men who were not members of the Church of England (subject to safeguards for religious instruction and worship), which made it possible for Catholics and Non-conformists to open private halls. The first Catholic private halls were Clarke's Hall (now Campion Hall), opened by the Jesuit Order in 1896 and Hunter Blair's Hall (later St Benet's Hall) opened by the Benedictine Order in 1899. 
In 1918 the university passed a statute to allow private halls which were not run for profit to become permanent private halls and the two halls took their current names.

Map

List of colleges

List of permanent private halls

College and permanent private hall arms and colours
Each college and permanent private hall has its own arms, although in some cases these were assumed rather than granted by the College of Arms. Under King Henry VIII Oxford colleges were granted exemption from having their arms granted by the College of Arms; and some, like Lady Margaret Hall, have chosen to take advantage of this exemption, whilst others, such as Oriel, despite having used the arms for many centuries, have recently elected to have the arms granted officially. The blazons below are taken from the Oxford University Calendar unless otherwise indicated. Shields are emblazoned as commonly drawn, and notable inconsistencies between blazons and emblazons (the shields as drawn) are indicated.

Each college also has its own colours used on items such as scarves and rowing blades.

Notes

Heads of Houses
The senior member of each college is an officer known generically as the Head of House. Their specific title varies from college to college as indicated in the list below. While the Head of House will usually be an academic, it is not uncommon for a person to be appointed who has had a distinguished career outside academic circles.

For a list of current Heads of Houses, see Heads of Houses.

Principal: Brasenose, Green Templeton, Harris Manchester, Hertford, Jesus College, Lady Margaret Hall, Linacre, Mansfield, St Anne's, St Edmund Hall, St Hilda's, St Hugh's, Somerville, Regent's Park, St Stephen's House, and Wycliffe Hall
Master: Balliol, Pembroke, St Catherine's, St Cross, St Peter's, University College, and Campion Hall
Warden: All Souls, Keble, Merton, New College, Nuffield, St Antony's, and Wadham.
President: Corpus Christi, Kellogg, Magdalen, Reuben, St John's, Trinity, and Wolfson
Provost: Oriel, The Queen's College, and Worcester
Rector: Exeter and Lincoln
Dean: Christ Church
Regent: Blackfriars

The dean of Christ Church is head of both the college and the cathedral. The president of Kellogg College is also the director of the Department for Continuing Education.

Finances
As of 2019 the accounts of the Oxford colleges included total assets of £6.6 billion. This figure does not reflect all the assets held by the colleges as their accounts do not include the cost or value of many of their main sites or heritage assets such as works of art or libraries. The total endowments of the colleges were £5.1 billion as of 2019. Individual college endowments ranged from £1.2m (Green Templeton) to £577.6 million (Christ Church).

Academic rankings
For some years, an unofficial ranking of undergraduate colleges by performance in Final Honour Schools examinations, known as the Norrington Table, was published annually. As the table only took into account the examination results for the year of publication, college rankings could fluctuate considerably.

Beginning in 2005, the University of Oxford started publishing a list of colleges classified by a "Norrington Score", effectively replicating the Norrington Table. The university claims to have published the results "in the interests of openness". Although the university says that the college listings are "not very significant", the 2005 table was the first Norrington Table with official data and also probably the first to be accurate. Dame Fiona Caldicott, the Chairman of the Conference of Colleges, said that in previous years some students had used the Data Protection Act 1998 to ensure their results were not published, rendering the unofficial tables inaccurate.

In 2020 New College ranked first among the 30 Oxford undergraduate colleges in the Norrington table.

College rivalries
A tradition of the university is a friendly rivalry between colleges. Often, two neighbouring colleges will be rivals, and each college will pride itself in its athletic victories over the other one. 
Examples include:
 Jesus College and Exeter College
 Brasenose College and Lincoln College
 Balliol College and Trinity College
 Christ Church and Pembroke College
 Keble College and St John's College
St Catherine's College and Magdalen College

Architectural influence 

The Oxford and Cambridge colleges have served as an architectural inspiration for Collegiate Gothic Architecture, used by a number of American universities including Princeton University and Washington University in St. Louis since the late nineteenth century.

See also
 List of fictional Oxford colleges
 Oxford scarf colours
 List of Oxbridge sister colleges
 Colleges of the University of Cambridge
 Colleges of Durham University
 Colleges of the University of York

Notes and references

 
University of Oxford